The angular hocicudo (Oxymycterus angularis) is a rodent species from South America. It is found in Brazil.

References

Oxymycterus
Mammals described in 1909
Taxa named by Oldfield Thomas